Clear Fork Valley Local School District is a public school district serving students in the villages of Bellville and Butler, most of Jefferson Township and Worthington Township, eastern parts of Perry Township, and southern parts of Washington Township in southern Richland County, Ohio, United States. Also the school district extends into northern parts of Pike Township in Knox County. The school district enrolls 1,865 students as of the 2007–2008 academic year.

Schools

Elementary schools
Bellville Elementary School (Grades K through 5th)
Butler Elementary School (Grades K through 5th)

Middle schools
Clear Fork Middle School (Grades 6th through 8th)

High schools
Clear Fork High School (Grades 9th through 12th)

References

External links
Clear Fork Valley Local School District official website

Education in Richland County, Ohio
Education in Knox County, Ohio
School districts in Ohio